Zest of is a 2008 album recorded by French pop singer Zazie. It was her first best of and her tenth album overall. It was released on 17 November 2008 digitally and under physical formats and achieved success in francophone countries. It provided a sole single, "FM Air" (a pun in French-language with "éphémère"), which was #8 in France and #19 in Belgium (Wallonia).

Description and chart performance
It contains 36 songs from Zazie's six studio albums, Je, tu, ils, Zen, Made in Love, La Zizanie, Rodéo and Totem. It includes in live a song from Made in Live and four others from the singer's later tour, Totem Tour, plus the duets with Axel Bauer and Pascal Obispo which didn't appear on Zazie's studio albums.

It also contains two new songs, "FM Air", available in six versions released on collector-edition vinyl (limited edition) and the song "Un peu beaucoup".

The best-of was available in two versions : standard editions (two CD), and the collector edition (2 CD + DVD, in a set box).

The album went straight to number-one in France (compilations chart) and remained at this position for seven weeks. It also debuted atop in Belgium and remained for 14 weeks in the top ten. It was much less successful in Switzerland, staying for only nine weeks on the chart.

Track listings

CD 1

CD 2

DVD (collector edition)

Charts and sales

Weekly charts

Year-end charts

Certifications and sales

References

2008 greatest hits albums
Zazie albums
2008 video albums
Music video compilation albums
Mercury Records compilation albums
Mercury Records video albums
Universal Music Group compilation albums
Universal Music Group video albums